{{Infobox shinty club
|clubname     = Oban
|image        = Oban camanachd.png
|fullname     = Oban Camanachd Club
|gaelicname   = Comann Camanachd an Obain
|nickname     = The Camancheroes
|founded      = 1889
|ground       = Mossfield Park, Oban
|manager      = Gareth Evans
|league       = Marine Harvest Premiership
|season       = 2019
|position     = 2nd"
|reservemanager =Andrew Pearson 
|reserveleague = South Division One
|reserveseason = 2019
|reserveposition = 3rd
|pattern_la1=_black_hoops
|pattern_b1=_blackhoops
|pattern_ra1=_black_hoops
|leftarm1=FF0000
|body1=FF0000
|rightarm1=FF0000
|shorts1=000000
|socks1=000000
|pattern_la2=
|pattern_b2=
|pattern_ra2=
|leftarm2=FFFFFF
|body2=FFFFFF
|rightarm2=FFFFFF
|shorts2=000000
|socks2=FFFFFF
}}Oban Camanachd are a shinty team based in Oban, Argyll and Bute, Scotland who currently play in the MOWI Premiership. One of the oldest Camanachd clubs they were founded in 1889. 
 
The reserve team currently play in South Division One under the name Lochside Rovers'.

 History

Established in Oban, Argyll in 1889, the club has always enjoyed competition against its great local rival, Oban Celtic.

Past successes included winning the Camanachd Cup (Scottish Cup) in 1933 – Oban Camanachd 3, Newtonmore 2, at Keppoch, Lochaber, after drawn game, 1–1, at Corpach, Fort William. This was followed my regaining the cup in 1938 – Oban Camanachd 4, Inverness 2. at Oban.

The Macauley Cup is always a competition close to the club members and supporters hearts as the final is played in Oban every year. The club has had a steady amount of success in this competition winning the cup and keeping it home in Oban a total of 5 times, 1952, 1954, 1957, 1993 and 1995

The Celtic Society Cup is where Oban Camanachd have enjoyed the most success. It is the oldest competition in the sport, first being played for in 1879. It is one of the five trophies considered to be part of the Grand Slam in the sport of shinty. The most recent success being in 2005 beating cup holders Inverary 2–1 in the semi final at Ballachullish. Meeting Bute in the final Oban Camanachd ran out 7–4 winners. The Club other successes in the competition were in 1889, 1900, 1904, 1911, 1937, 1938, 1947, 1973, 1987, 1988, 1989, 1990, 1991, 1992, 1993, 1994, 1997, 2018 and 2019

The Club have enjoyed regular success in the regional and national leagues and cups. Possibly the best Camanachd team was the 1970–80's team with quality players such internationalists Ian "Swally" MacIntyre, Bobby Galbraith, Dougie Macintyre, Neil MacDougal, Nigel Evans, Fraser Inglis and Chukie Clark, and were widely expected to lift the Camanachd Cup but succumbed to a rampant Kyles Athletic on four occasions.  Chukie Clark also has the unique distinction of being attacked and bitten by a dog during a game at Strachur.   This Camanachd side failed to live up to their true potential and the club went through a lean patch until Chukie Clark restructured the second team, Lochside Rovers, producing quality players for the senior team like Nonnie MacInnes, Ally MacInnes, Andrew Inglis and Damian Laird.

Oban Camanachd have won the Camanachd Cup on several occasions, most recently with victory over Kingussie in the 1996 final. Nonnie Macinnes was Captain on the day, but the game was most notable for the performance of Gordon MacIntyre who had made a miraculous recovery from the loss of an eye that year to score the winning goal.

The club is proactive in trying to maintain shinty as the main sport in Oban. In 2008 the club made attempts to alter the structure of youth shinty to allow their youths to compete against 'North' teams. This was turned down at the Camanachd Association AGM but in late October 2008, secretary Daniel MacIntyre made his fears known to the press, stating that "If we get Camanachd Association support, in the next three to five years we could potentially grow into a club with three senior teams. If we don’t, in the next three to five years we will be a one-team club".

In 2009, Lochside Rovers won South Division One, defeating several first teams.  Their reserve status meant that they cannot be promoted to the Premier Division, where Oban Camanachd firsts play.  This caused confusion regarding the ramifications for promotion and relegation to and from the Premier League, Glasgow Mid-Argyll were awarded the South's place in the Premier Division.

In 2010, the club president Nigel Evans slammed Argyll and Bute Council for their "unacceptable" increases in facility hire. The club again started to hit the headlines in late 2010 as relegation to South Division One loomed, meaning a double relegation as Lochside Rovers would need to be relegated to South Division Two.  Daniel Macintyre slammed the level of play in this league, painting a bleak picture for his own club.

Salvation from relegation came on the last day of the 2010 season when a 2–1 win over Bute saw the island team relegated instead.

Again in 2011, Oban were involved in the relegation battle and yet again the status of Lochside Rovers, despite another successful season which included the Bullough Cup, was unsure due to the implications of the first team's relegation.  This was confirmed on 19 November 2011 when the club won their last game against Kilmallie but not by the required number of goals to overhaul Inveraray. Oban had been ever present in the Premier Division since its creation.

The club bounced back to the Premier at the first attempt in 2012. They also were runners-up in the MacAulay Cup. The club's stay in the Premier League was short-lived and their 9th-placed finish in 2013 resulted in them competing in National Division One in 2014.  They again bounced back at the first opportunity and finished an admirable sixth in the Premier in 2015 alongside a Celtic Society Cup Final appearance where they lost a tight game to Kyles Athletic.

The club reached the Camanachd Cup final in 2016 and 2019, but were defeated on both occasions by Newtonmore.

The club's most recent success has been winning the Celtic Society Cup in 2018 and 2019 and runners-up in 2020. They also finished 2nd in the Premier league 2019 and runners-up in the MacAulay Cup 2019 and runners-up in the Camanachd Cup in 2019.

Lochside Rovers have recently won the Bullough Cup 2018, 2019 and runners-up in 2020. They also had national success winning the Sutherland Cup 2017 and 2019.

July 2022 saw permission given for a brand new 22,000 all seater arena at "wee" Ganavan to be constructed, with ground due to be broken early 2023 on the provisonally titled "Camarana stadium".

Season by Season record*2010-present only*2012: National League not reinstated until 2014. Relegation to South Div 1''

References

External links
Oban Camanachd Home Page
The Oban Times, Local Newspaper with Match Reports
Oban Camanachd
Gordon MacIntyre Profile
Oban rebuild

Sport in Argyll and Bute
Sports clubs established in 1889
Shinty teams
1889 establishments in Scotland
Oban